Noah Wafula (born 16 January 1990) is a Kenyan professional footballer who plays as a forward.

External links 
 

1990 births
Living people
Kenyan footballers
Kenya international footballers
Association football forwards